Elemér Csák (born 20 May 1944) is a Hungarian journalist who served as spokesman of the Hungarian government from 15 February 1995 to 30 June 1995.

References
 Elemér Csák's homepage

1944 births
Living people
Hungarian journalists
Government spokespersons of Hungary